Pontus Anders Mikael Wernbloom (born 25 June 1986) is a Swedish former professional footballer who played as a midfielder. Beginning his professional career with IFK Göteborg in 2005, he went on to represent AZ, CSKA Moscow, and PAOK before retiring at IFK Göteborg in 2021. A full international between 2007 and 2016, he won 51 caps for the Sweden national team and was a squad player at UEFA Euro 2012 and 2016.

Club career

IFK Göteborg
After playing for local club IK Kongahälla, he joined the youth team of IFK Göteborg in 2004, before being promoted to the senior team in 2005. He quickly made a name for himself with his hard tackles, fighting spirit and generally fearless playing style. When Håkan Mild retired after the 2005 season, Wernbloom secured a place in the starting line-up. However, during the following season he struggled to retain his place as the club changed its playing style under new management. When striker Marcus Berg left to play for FC Groningen in the summer of 2007, Wernbloom switched to forward and was able to be a starter once again.

AZ
In April 2009, he signed a contract with Dutch club AZ. He made his Eredivisie debut against Heracles Almelo on 2 August 2009 and scored his first goal in a 3–3 draw away to VVV on 20 February 2010. Wernbloom scored a goal in both play-off round legs against Kazakh side FC Aktobe, helping his team to qualify for the group stage of the 2010–11 UEFA Europa League.

CSKA Moscow
In January 2012, Wernbloom left AZ for signing a long-term contract with the Russian top club CSKA Moscow. Plagued by injuries, Wernbloom was plunged into the deep end against a highly favored Real Madrid side in the knockout stages of the Champions League. In the game against his alleged favorite club, he scored a dramatic half-volley in the dying minutes to equalize 1–1.

After the final game of the 2017–18 season, CSKA Moscow announced that Wernbloom would be leaving the club at the end of his contract for family reasons.

Wernbloom left CSKA Moscow after a successful six-year spell with the Russian team.

PAOK
On 16 August 2018, Wernbloom arrived in Thessaloniki to agree on personal terms with Greek club PAOK FC. Eventually he signed a three–year contract worth €1.1 million per year. On 17 December 2018, Wernbloom was unlucky in the away game against Levadiakos, as he suffered a ruptured achilles tendon and would stay out of the action for several months, meaning PAOK will be without a key player as they look to win their first league title since 1985. On 20 August 2020 his contract with PAOK was terminated.

Return to IFK Göteborg and retirement 
On 21 August 2020, Wernbloom signed a contract with IFK Göteborg until the end of the 2021 Allsvenskan season. He announced his immediate retirement from professional football on 14 July 2021, citing injury problems.

International career
He debuted for the Sweden under-21 side in 2006, scoring a goal in the 12th minute of the match. On 7 January 2007, he was picked for the Swedish national team's January Tour in South America, and he made his debut on 18 January against Ecuador. He won his 50th cap for Sweden on 29 March 2016, a 1–1 draw with the Czech Republic.
Pontus Wernbloom retired from international duty following UEFA Euro 2016. Wernbloom won 51 caps for Sweden, representing his country at UEFA Euro 2012 and 2016.

Personal life
Wernbloom married girlfriend Nina in 2010 who gave birth to their son Mille the following year. He openly took a stance against Sweden Democrats prior to the 2010 Swedish general election, and stated his support for social democracy in Aftonbladet.

Career statistics

Club

1Includes Svenska Cupen, KNVB Cup and Russian Cup.

2Includes UEFA Champions League and UEFA Europa League.

3Includes Svenska Supercupen, Johan Cruijff Shield and Russian Super Cup.

International 

 Scores and results list Sweden's goal tally first, score column indicates score after each Wernbloom goal.

Honours 
IFK Göteborg
Allsvenskan: 2007
Swedish Cup: 2008
Swedish Super Cup: 2008

AZ Alkmaar
Dutch Super Cup: 2009

CSKA Moscow
Russian Premier League: 2012–13, 2013–14, 2015–16
Russian Cup: 2012–13
Russian Super Cup: 2013, 2014

PAOK Salonika
Super League Greece: 2018–19
Greek Cup: 2018–19
Sweden U21
UEFA European Under-21 Championship bronze: 2009
Individual

 Stor Grabb: 2012

References

External links

 
 
 

1986 births
Living people
Swedish footballers
IFK Göteborg players
AZ Alkmaar players
Allsvenskan players
Eredivisie players
Sweden international footballers
Sweden under-21 international footballers
People from Kungälv Municipality
Swedish expatriate footballers
Expatriate footballers in the Netherlands
Swedish expatriate sportspeople in the Netherlands
Swedish socialists
Expatriate footballers in Russia
Swedish expatriate sportspeople in Russia
Russian Premier League players
PFC CSKA Moscow players
PAOK FC players
Expatriate footballers in Greece
Swedish expatriate sportspeople in Greece
UEFA Euro 2012 players
UEFA Euro 2016 players
Association football midfielders
Super League Greece players
Sportspeople from Västra Götaland County